This is a list collecting the most notable films produced in Hungary and in the Hungarian language during 1948–1989.

For an alphabetical list of articles on Hungarian films see :Category:Hungarian films.

1948–1959

1960-1969

1970-1979

1980-1989

References

External links
 Hungarian film at the Internet Movie Database

1948